Mongonui and Bay of Islands was a parliamentary electorate in the Far North District in the Northland region of New Zealand, from 1871 to 1881. It was represented by three Members of Parliament.

Population centres
The 1870 electoral redistribution was undertaken by a parliamentary select committee based on population data from the 1867 New Zealand census. Eight sub-committees were formed, with two members each making decisions for their own province; thus members set their own electorate boundaries. The number of electorates was increased from 61 to 72, and Mongonui and Bay of Islands was one of the new electorates. It was formed from areas of two former electorates: the  electorate in its entirety, and the northern part of the  electorate. The southern part of the latter electorate was divided along an arbitrary, straight line just north of Hikurangi and added to the  electorate.

Population centres that thus fell within the electorate included Kawakawa, Kaikohe, Russell, Kerikeri, Kaitaia, and Mangonui (which was spelled Mongonui before the 1880s). In the 1875 electoral redistribution, the electorate remained unaltered.

In the 1881 electoral redistribution, the Mongonui and Bay of Islands electorate was abolished and replaced with the  electorate. The only change was a slight adjustment of its boundary to the  electorate, but the same population centres as listed above were covered by the new electorate.

History
The first representative was John McLeod, who resigned in 1873. John William Williams won the resulting  and also held the electorate in the subsequent term.

Members of Parliament
The Mongonui and Bay of Islands electorate was represented by three Members of Parliament.

Key

1873 by-election

Notes

References

Historical electorates of New Zealand
Far North District
Politics of the Northland Region
1871 establishments in New Zealand
1881 disestablishments in New Zealand
Bay of Islands